Ali Hasan al-Ahmadi (born 1956) is a Yemeni politician and diplomat. He has been serving as ambassador of Yemen to Bahrain since 2016.

Biography 
He was born in 1956 in Shabwah. He got a PhD in economics in 1991. He held many positions, including governor of Al Baydha Governorate in 1991, and then govern of Hajjah Governorate before his appointment as Minister of Fisheries in 2001. He later served as ambassador of Yemen to Kuwait in 2003. He was elected as governor of Shabwah in 2008 and in 2012 was appointed as chief of National Security Bureau.

References 

1956 births
Fisheries ministers of Yemen
20th-century Yemeni politicians
21st-century Yemeni politicians

People from Shabwah Governorate
Ambassadors of Yemen to Kuwait
Governors of Shabwah Governorate
Governors of Hajjah Governorate
Governors of Al Bayda Governorate
Ambassadors of Yemen to Bahrain
21st-century Yemeni diplomats
Living people